Salba  is a Syrian village located in Sabburah Nahiyah in Salamiyah District, Hama.  According to the Syria Central Bureau of Statistics (CBS), Salba had a population of 556 in the 2004 census.

References 

Populated places in Salamiyah District